A Troubled Resting Place (1996) is a compilation album by the American ambient musician Robert Rich. The first five tracks were originally released on multi-artist compilations. The sixth and final track is Rich’s 1994 mini-CD release Night Sky Replies.

In spite of the wide variety of sources of the material in this compilation, there is a constant style throughout the album. It consists of dark, turbulent  organic atmospheres.

Track listing
”The Simorgh Sleeps on Velvet Tongues” – 10:14
(Originally released on The Throne of Drones, 1995.)
”Calling by Stormlight” – 5:10
(Originally released on Twilight Earth II, 1995.)
”Buoyant on Motionless Deluge” – 8:00
(Originally released on Swarm of Drones, 1995.)
”Bioelectric Plasma” – 16:42
(Originally released on DeepNet, 1996.)
”Black Skies” – 5:19
(Originally released on The Promises of Silences, 1993)
”Night Sky Replies”
”A Ripple of Sand” – 3:22
”Night Spinning Inward” – 6:28
A Wheel Questions the Ground” – 7:10
”The Night Sky Replies” – 4:20
(Originally released on Night Sky Replies, 1994)

External links
Hearts of Space Records Album Page

Robert Rich (musician) albums
1996 compilation albums
Hearts of Space Records albums